The 1997 Western Plains winter storms comprised a system of extreme snowfall and wind from October 24–26, 1997. The storms resulted in 13 deaths (five in Colorado, two each in Nebraska and Illinois, and one each in Michigan, Iowa, Oklahoma, and Kansas), and caused power outages and school closings lasting up to a week in affected areas.  The event was billed by the University of Nebraska-Lincoln as being a "two-hundred year storm". Mild temperatures earlier in October had kept the leaves on the trees longer than usual. The weight of the heavy snow on the leaves and wind caused significant damage, downing trees and power poles.

Effects in Nebraska 

A large portion of the state received blackouts, including the southeastern portion of the state, which includes major cities Lincoln and Omaha.

Lincoln effects

Though the storm affected several states, the city of Lincoln received some of the most notorious damage. Power outages affected the city for several days, and school was canceled for a week. The city was said to have lost at least 100,000 trees. Records set for Lincoln as a result of the storm include: 

 Record Low Temperature of 8 degrees F., October 27 (old record 17 F, 1925).
 Earliest ever single digit temperature.
 Monthly snowfall total of 13.2 inches was the most recorded for any October in the 98 year data record (old record, 6.6 inches October 1970).

External links
 University of Wisconsin site with much information on the storm's effects in general
 University of Nebraska site with many pages about the storm from Lincoln's perspective
 NCDC NOAA site regarding the storm
 NOAA page including Iowa radar
 NOAA page reporting statistics from Nebraska

Western Plains Winter Storms, 1997
Western Plains Winter Storms, 1997
Natural disasters in Colorado
Natural disasters in Nebraska
Natural disasters in Illinois
Natural disasters in Michigan
Natural disasters in Iowa
Natural disasters in Oklahoma
Natural disasters in Kansas
Natural disasters in Omaha, Nebraska
Western Plains winter storms